Tungi may refer to:
 Tungi, in Saint Helena a local name for the prickly or cactus pear Opuntia ficus-indica
 Tungi Spirit, an alcoholic beverage produced on Saint Helena from the fermented fruits of this plant
 Tongi, Bangladesh
 Tung Fort, Pune District, India
 Tungi, Bihar, a village in Nalanda district in Bihar, India
 Viliami Tungī Mailefihi (1888–1941), Tongan high chieftain and Prince Consort
 Prince Tungi Tongan Prince